Manuel Sánchez Montemayor (born 5 January 1991) is a tennis player from Mexico. He played in the ATP 500 Mexican Open event and was on the Mexican Davis Cup squad in 2011.

References

Sources

Living people
1991 births
Mexican male tennis players
Sportspeople from San Luis Potosí
Pan American Games competitors for Mexico
Tennis players at the 2015 Pan American Games
Tennis players at the 2019 Pan American Games